is an annual touring ice show in Japan produced by CIC Co., Ltd. The show emerged from the "Philippe Candeloro Japan Tour 2001", named after retired French figure skater Philippe Candeloro, and was held under the name "Fantasy on Ice" the following two years. The tour was revived in 2010 and got expanded to larger venues in the metropolitan area of Tokyo in 2014 and Kobe in 2015.

From 2015 onwards, Fantasy on Ice was held around June, lasting one month and generally involving four stops in different prefectures across Japan. The cast includes active and retired competitive figure skaters, acrobats, and guest artists. Each show features a series of exhibition performances, including multiple live music collaborations between skaters and artists. The professional male single skaters Yuzuru Hanyu, Stéphane Lambiel, and Johnny Weir are the lead cast members of the show, having been scheduled for all Fantasy on Ice tours since its revival in 2010.

History

Beginnings

The Fantasy on Ice tour traces its roots back to 2001. Kikuo Makabe, representative director of CIC Co., Ltd. and producer of the show, took inspiration from another event held in Lyon the same year. He was impressed by the unconventional concept of combining circus, stage illusion, acrobatics, and other entertainment beyond the confines of a usual ice show. Two-time Olympic bronze medalist Philippe Candeloro from France was the chairman of the event.

Makabe was contacted by Candeloro's agent and they exchanged emails about a potential collaboration project in Japan, which eventually resulted in the "Philippe Candeloro Japan Tour 2001", held in Yokohama in September 2001. Among the guest skaters, besides Candeloro, were five-time European champion Surya Bonaly from France, 1992 Olympic champion Viktor Petrenko from the Ukraine, the 1998 Olympic champions in pairs, Oksana Kazakova and Artur Dmitriev, and the ice dance team Maya Usova and Evgeni Platov from Russia.

The show returned in the following years, in November 2002 and March 2003, under the new name "Philippe Candeloro Fantasy on Ice". Makabe and the production team had a "deep attachment to this name", so they registered it as a trademark in 2002 and planned to develop it as its own brand. However, due to financial deficits of another ice show project in France and disagreements between Candeloro and his agent, the collaboration came to an abrupt end and Makabe was forced to start the production of Fantasy on Ice from scratch. In 2006, he brought Champions on Ice, a touring ice show in the United States, to Japan for the first time. In the course of this event, Makabe teamed up with two skaters who would later become an "indispensable part" of Fantasy on Ice; two-time world champion Stéphane Lambiel and 2008 world bronze medalist Johnny Weir.

Revival of the show in 2010

After a seven-year break, Fantasy on Ice made its return in 2010. The first tour stop took place in July in the Niigata Convention Center at Toki Messe in Niigata. The show was hosted in partnership with Niigata Sogo Television, who had already worked with Makabe's production team on Champions on Ice and other events in the past. For Makabe, it was important to add live music collaborations with vocalists as a new facet of the show. He invited the Japanese a capella group The Gospellers who performed together at the show with Johnny Weir, 2006 Olympic champion Evgeni Plushenko from Russia, Japanese skater and commentator Junko Yaginuma, and two-time European ice dance champions Nathalie Péchalat and Fabian Bourzat from France. Among the special guests was Spanish flamenco dancer and figure skating choreographer, Antonio Najarro, who choreographed the opening and finale of the show.

There was a two-month break between the first and second tour stop, which was held in September at the Sun Dome Fukui in Echizen. The invited guest artists, Hungarian violinist Edvin Marton and Russian singer Dima Bilan, performed with Evgeni Plushenko their winning song "Believe" from the Eurovision Song Contest 2008. It was the only occasion in the history of the show that the guest artists were not domestic performers from Japan.

Impact of the 2011 Tōhoku earthquake

After the 2011 Tōhoku earthquake and tsunami had hit the north east coast of Japan, causing severe devastation in the region, it was unclear whether the Fantasy on Ice tour could be held, as the recovery process was still at the beginning. Two-time Olympic champion Yuzuru Hanyu from Japan, who had just moved up to senior level in competition at that time, lost his practice rink from the disaster in his hometown of Sendai. With the organization of the tour stops in Kanazawa and Fukuoka, Makabe and his team were able to provide Hanyu an opportunity to practice in the period from June to July. "It was impressive to see how the international skaters cared for Hanyu and tried to cheer him up", noted Makabe in his book from 2021. "It was as if I was witnessing Hanyu becoming a symbol of the recovery from the earthquake and tsunami."

Another cast member, who grew up in Sendai with a close connection to the victims of the disaster, was the 2006 Olympic figure skating champion Shizuka Arakawa. She performed at the 2011 Fantasy on Ice with her friend, guest artist Mai Kuraki, to the charity song "". A special recording of their performance was released as a video single on August 31 the same year. Monkey Majik, another Sendai-based pop rock band, was invited to the final tour stop in Niigata in September.

Makuhari era
During the following two years, the Fantasy on Ice tour was reduced to one stop, with Fukui in September 2012 and Fukuoka in July 2013. Since its revival in 2010, the show had been held exclusively in regional cities of Japan until 2013. The main reason for this  decision was the large size of figure skating venues in the metropolitan area of Tokyo, which caused sponsorships to be restrained from a collaboration. However, Hanyu's victory at the 2014 Winter Olympics in Sochi lead to a large increase of interest in figure skating and ice shows around the country. For the first time, Fantasy on Ice added a tour stop in the Tokyo area with the event hall at Makuhari Messe in Chiba. Makabe had special memories of that arena, which had served as a venue for the 1994 World Championships, with Yuka Sato winning gold for Japan and Candeloro the silver medal in the men's event. From 2014 onwards, Makuhari has become a regular event, and the tour was expanded to four stops in total. P&G agreed to sponsor the show. The World Memorial Hall in Kobe was added as the second main stop in 2015.

In the meantime, Hanyu had become an integral member of the Fantasy on Ice cast, having joined each tour since its revival in 2010, with one exception, having missed out on the 2016 edition due to rehabilitation from a ligament injury. Makabe deliberated on the prospects of the show, stating: "It is an undeniable fact that for several years, Hanyu has not only skated the last act, but has been the backbone of the entire show, and I felt that this was the critical moment to test the true value of Fantasy on Ice". However, in Hanyu's absence, the show ran a deficit at the second stop in Sapporo with empty seats in the upper sections. Stéphane Lambiel felt concerned, but Makabe remained optimistic for the events to come.

Development after the 2018 Winter Olympics

On the occasion of Hanyu's victory at the 2018 Winter Olympics in Pyeongchang, becoming the first male single skater in 66 years to win back-to-back titles, the Fantasy on Ice tour got expanded to five stops for the first time. With Hanyu, German pair skaters Aljona Savchenko and Bruno Massot, and the Canadian ice dance team Tessa Virtue and Scott Moir, the cast featured three of the four individual gold medalists of 2018 in figure skating. The Olympic champion in women's singles, Alina Zagitova, joined the tour the following year in 2019.

In the 2019 edition of Fantasy on Ice, the tour was merged with a new Spanish collaboration project; Flamenco on Ice made its debut at the first two stops in Makuhari and Sendai, lead by two-time world figure skating champion Javier Fernández and Antonio Najarro. The central idea behind Flamenco on Ice was the fusion of figure skating and flamenco dance. The team included former ice dancer Celia Robledo and the single skaters Javier Raya, Sonia Lafuente, and Fernández' sister Laura. Their performance to "Malagueña" was accompanied by guitarist José Luis Montón, percussionist Odei Lizaso, and the voices of María Mezcle and Saray Muñoz. In a press release, Najarro expressed his satisfaction with the project: "Of all the times I’ve come to Japan, invited as a choreographer for figure skating shows, this one has been the most gratifying, without a doubt."

In 2020, it was planned to hold an event outside Japan for the first time, at the Shanghai Oriental Sports Center in China. However, due to the COVID-19 pandemic, the event was postponed for an indefinite period of time. In addition, all domestic events were cancelled on April 20, 2020. After another year break in 2021, the tour eventually returned in 2022 with a new stop at the Nippon Gaishi Hall in Nagoya.

Concept and design of the show

Procedure of the tour and single shows
Since 2015, the Fantasy on Ice tour has typically consisted of four stops in different prefectures of Japan, with Makuhari and Kobe as recurring locations. Each stop lasts three days (from Friday to Sunday) with one show per day, featuring a cast of about twenty figure skaters, a group of aerial and ice acrobats, and multiple guest artists. The shows have an average runtime of three and a half hours with a thirty minute intermission. They are a mix of live music performances and exhibition programs with sound recordings, such as debuts or revivals of competitive programs. The tour generally starts at the end of May and finishes at the end of June. Usually after the first two tour stops, there are changes in the cast of skaters and invited artists.

The opening and finale of the show feature the full cast, accompanied with live music by the guest artists. The choreographers for the group performances have changed throughout the years. Some notable choreographers were Antonio Najarro, Japanese ice dancer Kenji Miyamoto, two-time Olympic silver medalist Brian Orser, Canadian figure skater David Wilson, and the 2008 world champion, Jeffrey Buttle. The opening theme song "Fantasy on Ice" was composed by Maxime Rodriguez and is played as an instrumental version in the live shows. A special recording with lyrics and vocals by Sarah Àlainn was released by the label Universal Music Japan in 2016. Since the 2017 edition of Fantasy on Ice, the costumes for the opening and finale performances have been designed by Taketoshi Hara.

Construction and design of the rink

With exception of the Big Hat ice hockey arena in Nagano and the Makomanai Ice Arena in Sapporo, the venues of the past Fantasy on Ice shows did not have a permanent ice rink, so it was necessary to resort to mobile rinks, a technology which had been used since the 1950s at shows like Ice Capades. Fantasy on Ice uses the Icerack system, developed by the German company ISS GmbH. The workers have a setup time of two days, while the disassembly must be completed within twelve hours.

The rink has dimensions of 50 m × 25 m, which equals 70 percent of the size of an Olympic figure skating rink (60 m × 30 m). In comparison to competitions, the rink at Fantasy on Ice has no boards, so the audience has full view at the skaters from all angles. The stage is placed directly next to the ice surface, while the spectator seats surround the rink from the other three sides. In some venues like the Nippon Gaishi Hall in Nagoya, there were also seats available behind the stage, but the audience had only limited view at the guest artists from that perspective.

Since the show's revival in 2010, verious improvements had been made in terms of sound and lighting. One of the biggest challenges was a proper merge of the live music played on the stage, and the recorded sound from speakers installed at the ceiling, which required adjustments in the equipment, volume level, and placement of the speakers. Another issue was the limited number of pinspots around the rink, which made it difficult to follow all skaters in group performances at the same time. Hence, the production team focused on the effective use of laser lighting for the show.

Live music collaborations

For producer Kikuo Makabe, the core of the show are the live music collaborations between skaters and artists. Unlike competitions and usual exhibition galas, where the skaters use sound recordings with familiar timing and constant tempo, the tempo and tone of the singing voice naturally fluctuates during a live performance, which makes the synchronisation of the music and skating more difficult. The collaborations with domestic artists are an additional challenge on the parts of overseas skaters, who need to translate the Japanese lyrics and understand their meaning, so that they can properly express the song through their skating. On the other hand, it is a unique opportunity to experience the fusion of two artistic genres in one performance.

A show opening that attracted international media attention was a live music version of "A Cruel Angel's Thesis" from the anime series Neon Genesis Evangelion. The song was performed by the Japanese pop rock singer Toshi and the cast of the 2019 Fantasy on Ice in Kobe and Toyama. Notable is also the collaboration between the Yoshida Brothers, a duo of  musicians, and Javier Fernández to the song "Barcelona". Kenichi Yoshida, the younger of the two brothers, had been in Barcelona as an exchange envoy of the Agency for Cultural Affairs in 2015, few months prior to the ice show in Japan.

Another notable performance was Nobunari Oda's short program to "Storm" from the 2010–11 season, which he performed live with the Yoshida Brothers at the 2016 Fantasy on Ice.

Usually, it is Makabe and the production team who select and invite the guest artists. However, in some cases the cast members asked for special collaborations on their own accord. Junko Yaginuma and the Gospellers were alumni of the same university and wished to perform together in 2010. Singer Ai was introduced to the production team by Miki Ando, who was a big fan of the Japanese singer and songwriter. The two performed together to the song "Dear Mama" in 2013, after Ando had given birth to her child the previous year.

Since his first collaboration project at the 2012 Fantasy on Ice, Yuzuru Hanyu has dedicated a series of programs to the victims of the 2011 Tōhoku earthquake and tsunami. In 2012, he performed live with singer Fumiya Sashida to the Japanese song "". More tribute programs followed, among them a live performance with Ai to "Story" in 2013 as well as a special instrumental version of Yumi Matsutoya's song "", played by pianist , in 2018. The latter was reused by Hanyu in multiple exhibition galas the following years and received international recognition at the 2022 Winter Olympics in Beijing.

Attendance and accessibility

Ticket sales and live viewing events
The capacity of the venues varies between 5,000 and 10,000 seats, usually divided into six different price categories. Since the inauguration of the venue in Kobe in 2015, prices had been mostly consistent with ¥7,000 (US$52 as of 2022) and ¥10,000 in the lower categories, having been raised to ¥8,000 and ¥12,000 in 2022. Prices for premiere seats went from ¥22,000 to ¥27,000, depending on the weekday and venue. The profitability of the show has varied throughout the years, with some events having run deficits like the 2016 tour stop in Sapporo. In 2022, tickets were distributed by lottery sale with full ranks in Makuhari among others.

Due to the high ticket demand in 2022, it was decided to stream the Sunday shows of all four tour stops live at cinemas in different prefectures across Japan. On June 5, the show in Nagoya was aired live in 90 movie theaters nationwide. In addition to the domestic live viewing events, the final show in Kobe was planned to be aired at four participating cinemas in Taiwan, with all tickets being sold out within a day. As a reaction to the fast sales, another two movie theaters in the cities Taipei and Tainan were added. Tickets were sold at fixed prices for ¥4,000 in Japan and NT$1,000 (US$34 as of 2022) in Taiwan.

Television broadcast and media coverage

Selected shows, usually the final events on Sunday, were broadcast live or with few weeks delay on Japanese television. In 2022, most shows were aired on the subscription channel CS TV Asahi. Some archived recordings from previous years were replayed as specials like the "2022 Golden Week Figure Skating Broadcast" on CS TV Asahi from May 29 to June 5. As of June 2022, the Fantasy on Ice show was not planned to be broadcast or livestreamed outside Japan, which made it particularly difficult for international audience to access recordings of the events. In August 2022, Fantasy on Ice uploaded various recordings of the opening performances from Kobe and Shizuoka to their official YouTube channel.

Since its beginnings with the "Philippe Candeloro Japan Tour 2001", Fantasy on Ice has been covered by various Japanese figure skating mooks and magazines like World Figure Skating, Kiss & Cry or Figure Skate Life. In later years, more general news and sports magazines followed with Aera, Sports Graphic Number, and Sportiva among others. Fantasy on Ice also sells its own pamphlet with summaries of the shows, interviews with the cast members, backstage footage, and more. In addition, various photobooks and online image galleries of the shows were published by the renowned figure skating photographers Sunao Noto, Yukihito Taguchi, and Nobuaki Tanaka. A special slide gallery of the opening show in Makuhari 2022 was presented on the website of the Japanese daily newspaper Yomiuri Shimbun, with photographies by Kazuki Wakasugi.

Locations and venues

Editions and guest artists

Skaters

Main cast

Guest skaters

Men's singles
 Tatsuki Machida (2010–2014)
 Viktor Petrenko (2010)
 Evgeni Plushenko (2010, 2015, 2017–2019)
 Tomáš Verner (2010–2011, 2015–2016)
 Jeremy Abbott (2011)
 Artur Gachinski (2011–2012)
 Brian Joubert (2011–2013, 2015–2016)
 Kensuke Nakaniwa (2011)
 Yasuharu Nanri (2011)
 Daisuke Takahashi (2011, 2014)
 Tomoyuki Koriyama (2013)
 Nam Nguyen (2013–2015)
 Akio Sasaki (2013)
 Shoma Uno (2015–2017)
 Ilia Kulik (2016)
 Elladj Baldé (2017–2022)
 Deniss Vasiljevs (2017–2022)
 Misha Ge (2018)
 Takahito Mura (2018)
 Jason Brown (2022)
 Kao Miura (2022)
 Keiji Tanaka (2022)

Women's singles
 Surya Bonaly (2010)
 Haruka Imai (2010–2011, 2013–2014)
 Kanako Murakami (2010–2014)
 Fumie Suguri (2010–2011)
 Junko Yaginuma (2010)
 Yuka Sato (2011)
 Elizaveta Tuktamysheva (2011, 2019)
 Wakaba Higuchi (2015–2016)
 Marin Honda (2015–2017)
 Yuka Nagai (2015)
 Yuna Aoki (2015–2016)
 Satoko Miyahara (2016, 2018–2022)
 Rika Kihira (2017–2019)
 Carolina Kostner (2017–2018)
 Evgenia Medvedeva (2017–2019)
 Mai Mihara (2017–2022)
 Anna Pogorilaya (2017–2018)
 Kaori Sakamoto (2017–2022)
 Alina Zagitova (2019)
 Mana Kawabe (2022)
 Rino Matsuike (2022)

Pairs
 Tatiana Volosozhar and Maxim Trankov (2011, 2014–2016, 2019)
 Meagan Duhamel and Eric Radford (2015)
 Ksenia Stolbova and Fedor Klimov (2016)
 Aljona Savchenko and Bruno Massot (2018)

Ice dance
 Nathalie Péchalat and Fabian Bourzat (2010–2011, 2014)
 Marina Anissina and Gwendal Peizerat (2012)
 Meryl Davis and Charlie White (2016)
 Gabriella Papadakis and Guillaume Cizeron (2017, 2022)
 Tessa Virtue and Scott Moir (2018–2019)

Ice acrobats
Oleksiy Polishchuk and Vladimir Besedin (2010–2014, 2016–2022)
Violetta Afanasieva and Pete Dack (2012)
Gev Manoukian (2012, 2014–2015)
Sergei Yakimenko (2014–2015)

Aerialists
Ekaterina Chesna and Alexander Chesna (2010–2013, 2015–2018)
Airy Japan (2014)
Irina Usenko (2015)
Valérie Inertie (2016)
Marie-Pierre Leray (2016–2017)
Mery Acevedo and Alfonso Campa (2019–2022)

Notes

References

Citations

Books and magazines cited

 159 p.

 208 p.
 144 p.

External links
fantasy-on-ice.com (official website)
Fantasy on Ice on YouTube (official channel)

 
Ice shows
Touring performing arts
Annual events in Japan
Entertainment events in Japan
Recurring events established in 2010
Yuzuru Hanyu